"Girl Why Don't You" is a song originally performed by Prince Buster, covered by ska band Madness for their 2005 album, "The Dangermen Sessions Vol. 1. It was the third cover of a Prince Buster song to be released by the group, following "Madness" and "One Step Beyond". The single failed to attract much air play from radio stations and made little impression on the UK Singles Chart, failing to reach the top 75.

CD Track Listing
"Girl Why Don't You?" - (3:08)
"I Chase The Devil AKA Ironshirt (BBC Radio 2 Session)" - (3:32)
"Girl Why Don't You? (Dub)" - (3:09)

External links

2005 singles
Madness (band) songs
Songs written by Prince Buster
V2 Records singles
Year of song missing